168th meridian may refer to:

168th meridian east, a line of longitude east of the Greenwich Meridian
168th meridian west, a line of longitude west of the Greenwich Meridian